Cuckoo Moray, also credited as Cuckoo or Cukoo (1928 – 30 September 1981), was an Anglo-Indian dancer and actress in Indian cinema. Cuckoo was the queen of film dancing in Hindi cinema of the 1940s and 1950s. Though unfamiliar in name, she was known as the "rubber girl" of Hindi cinema and her talent made cabaret dancing a must in the Bollywood films during the 1940s and 1950s. It has been recently confirmed that Cuckoo's real name was Cuckoo Moray.

Early career
Cuckoo made her screen debut in the film Arab Ka Sitara in 1946. Soon after in Stum Chandi, directors and greater audiences noticed her dancing abilities for the first time. Then, the turning point in Cuckoo's career was in Mehboob Khan's films. Her dance number in his film Anokhi Ada (1948) established her as the lead dancer of the era and in Andaz (1949), a romantic drama starring Nargis, Dilip Kumar, and Raj Kapoor, gave the dancing star an opportunity to display her acting skills. In Mehboob Khan's 1952 technicolor film Aan, which was her first colour film, she had a brief cameo in a dance sequence. She only appeared in 2 colour films in her career Aan & Mayurpankh. She would charge Rs 6,000 for a dance number, an enviable fee in the 50s.

Later life
Cuckoo remained the best dancer in Hindi films until dancers such as Helen and Vyjayanthimala came into the industry. Cuckoo was a family friend of the Anglo-Burmese dancer and actress Helen. She was also known for helping unknown actors get their break in Bollywood, such as Pran in Ziddi. Cuckoo had introduced a 13-year-old Helen into films as a chorus dancer in films such as Shabistan and Awaara (both 1951). Cuckoo and Helen most notably appeared in song and dance sequences together, such as in Chalti Ka Naam Gaadi (1958) and Yahudi (1958). Her last film appearance was in Mujhe Jeene Do in 1963 after which, she had disappeared from the film industry.

Cuckoo died on 30 September 1981 due to cancer at the age of 53. She was forgotten and unattended by the film industry at the time of her death.

Selected filmography

References

External links
 
 Full filmography and biography of Cuckoo (in French)

1981 deaths
Indian film actresses
Actresses in Hindi cinema
1929 births
Anglo-Indian people
Actresses of European descent in Indian films
Indian female dancers
20th-century Indian actresses